Colpomimus colpodoides is a species of beetle in the family Carabidae, the only species in the genus Colpomimus.

References

Platyninae